This is a list of Mieczysław Weinberg's compositions by opus number.

List of works 

 [no opus number]: Two Mazurkas (1933)
 [no opus number]: Three Pieces for violin and piano (1934)
 Opus 1: Lullaby for piano (1935)
 Opus 2: String Quartet No. 1 (1937) [see also Op. 141]
 Opus 3: String Quartet No. 2 (1940) [see also Op. 145]
 Opus 4: Acacias, six romances after J. Tuwim for singer and piano (1940)
 Opus 5: Piano Sonata No. 1 (1940)
 Opus 6: Symphonic Poem for orchestra (1941)
 Opus 7: Three Romances after J. Rivina and A. Prokofiev (1941)
 Opus 8: Piano Sonata No. 2 (1942)
 [no opus number]: Comrades in Arms, operetta (1942)
 [no opus number]: Clarettes Career, operetta (1942)
 Opus 9: Aria for string quartet (1942)
 [no opus number]: Battle for the Fatherland, ballet (1942)
 [no opus number]: The Sword of Uzbekistan, opera (1942)
 Opus 10: Symphony No. 1 (1942)
 Opus 11: Capriccio for string quartet (1943)
 Opus 12: Sonata No. 1 for violin and piano (1943)
 Opus 13: Children's Songs after I.L. Peretz for singer and piano (1943)
 Opus 14: String Quartet No. 3 (1944)
 Opus 15: Sonata No. 2 for violin and piano (1944)
 Opus 16: Children's Notebook No. 1 for piano (1944)
 Opus 17: Jewish Songs after Shmuel Halkin (1944)
 Opus 18: Piano Quintet (1944)
 Opus 19: Children's Notebook No. 2 for piano (1944)
 Opus 20: String Quartet No. 4 (1945)
 Opus 21: Sonata No. 1 for cello and piano in C major (1945)
 Opus 22: Three Romances after A. Mickiewicz for singer and piano (1945)
 Opus 23: Children's Notebook No. 3 for piano (1945)
 Opus 24: Piano Trio (1945)
 [no opus number]: Fantasy on Themes from Adolphe Adam's opera Le chalet for orchestra (1945)
 Opus 25: Six Romances after F. Tyutchev for singer and piano (1945)
 Opus 26: Suite for small orchestra (1939–1945)
 Opus 27: String Quartet No. 5 (1945)
 Opus 28: Sonata for clarinet (or viola) and piano (1945)
 Opus 29: Twelve Miniatures for flute and piano (1946)
 Opus 30: Symphony No. 2 for string orchestra (1946)
 Opus 31: Piano Sonata No. 3 (1946)
 Opus 32: Elegy after F. Schiller for baritone and piano (1946)
 Opus 33: Six Sonettes after W. Shakespeare for bass and piano (1946)
 Opus 34: Twenty-One Easy Pieces for piano (1946)
 Opus 35: String Quartet No. 6 (1946)
 Opus 36: Festive Scenes for orchestra (1946–1947)
 Opus 37: Sonata No. 3 for violin and piano (1947)
 Opus 38: Four Romances after Maksym Rylsky and G. Nikolayeva for singer and piano (1947)
 Opus 39: Sonata No. 4 for violin and piano (1947)
 Opus 40: Two Ballet Suites for orchestra (1947)
 [no opus number]: Two Choruses for male chorus a cappella (1948)
 Opus 41: Sinfonietta No. 1 (1948)
 Opus 42: Concertino for violin and string orchestra (1948)
 Opus 43bis: Concertino for cello and orchestra in C minor (1948)
 Opus 43: Concerto for cello and orchestra in C minor (1948)
 Opus 44: Greetings Overture for orchestra (1949)
 Opus 45: Symphony No. 3 (1949)
 Opus 46: Sonatina for violin and piano in D major (1949)
 Opus 47 No. 1: Rhapsody on Moldavian Themes for orchestra (1949)
 Opus 47 No. 2: Polish Tunes for orchestra (1949)
 Opus 47 No. 3: Moldavian Rhapsody for violin and orchestra (1949)
 Opus 47 No. 4: Serenada for orchestra (1949)
 [no opus number]: Portraits of Friends for piano (1950)
 [no opus number]: Improvisation for string quartet (1950)
 [no opus number]: Suite for orchestra (1950)
 Opus 48: String Trio (1950)
 [no opus number]: Rhapsody on Slavonic Themes for orchestra (1950)
 Opus 49: Sonatina for piano (1951)
 [no opus number]: March for orchestra (1952)
 [no opus number]: Kujawiak and Oberek for two xylophones and orchestra (1952)
 Opus 50: At the Source of the Past, songcycle after Alexander Blok for mezzo-soprano and piano (1951)
 Opus 51: In the Homeland, cantata after poems of Soviet children for boys-alto, boys chorus, mixed chorus and orchestra (1952)
 [no opus number]: Overture for orchestra (1953)
 Opus 52: Fantasy for cello and orchestra (1951–1953)
 Opus 53: Sonata No. 5 for violin and piano (1953)
 Opus 54: Partita for piano (1954)
 Opus 55: The Golden Key, ballet in six scenes, after Alexey Tolstoy (1954–1955)
 Opus 55A: Suite No. 1 from the ballet The Golden Key (1964)
 Opus 55B: Suite No. 2 from the ballet The Golden Key (1964)
 Opus 55C: Suite No. 3 from the ballet The Golden Key (1964)
 Opus 55D: Suite No. 4 from the ballet The Golden Key (1964)
 Opus 56: Piano Sonata No. 4 in B minor (1955)
 Opus 57: Bible of the Gypsies, seven romances after J. Tuwim for mezzo-soprano and piano (1956)
 Opus 58: Piano Sonata No. 5 (1956)
 Opus 59: String Quartet No. 7 (1957)
 Opus 60: Morning-Red, symphonic poem for orchestra (1957)
 Opus 61: Symphony No. 4 in A minor (1957) (Revised in 1961)
 Opus 62: Memories after J. Tuwim for middle-voice and piano (1957–1958)
 Opus 63: Sonata for cello and piano No. 2 in g minor (1958–1959)
 Opus 64: The White Chrysantheme, ballet in three acts after A. Rumnev and J. Romanovich (1958)
 Opus 65: In the Armenian Mountains after O. Tumanian for singer and piano (1958)
 Opus 66: String Quartet No. 8 (1959)
 Opus 67: Violin Concerto in G minor (1959)
 [no opus number]: Twelve Months, suite from the film (1959)
 Opus 68: Symphonic Songs for orchestra (1959) (Revised from 1951 version)
 Opus 69: Sonata for two violins (1959)
 Opus 70: Seven Romances after Sándor Petőfi, for tenor and piano (1960)
 Opus 71: Seven Romances after various poets for singer and piano (1940-1972)
 Opus 72: Sonata No. 1 for cello solo (1960)
 Opus 73: Piano Sonata No. 6 (1960)
 Opus 74: Sinfonietta No. 2 for string orchestra and timpani (1960)
 Opus 75: Concerto for flute and string orchestra (1961)
 Opus 76: Symphony No. 5 in F minor (1962)
 Opus 77: Old Letters after J. Tuwim for soprano and piano (1962)
 Opus 78: Three romances after V. Sosnora, Y. Vinokurov and A. Yashin for singer and piano (1962)
 Opus 79: Symphony No. 6 after Leib Kvitko, Shmuel Halkin and M. Lukonin for boys' chorus and orchestra (1962–1963)
 Opus 80: String Quartet No. 9 (1963)
 Opus 81: Symphony No. 7 in C major for strings and harpsichord (1964)
 Opus 82: Sonata No. 1 for violin solo (1964)
 Opus 83: Symphony No. 8 Flowers of Poland after J. Tuwim for tenor, mixed chorus and orchestra (1964)
 Opus 84: Oh, Grey Fog, romance after J. Tuwim for bass and piano (1964)
 Opus 85: String Quartet No. 10 (1964)
 Opus 86: Sonata No. 2 for cello solo (1965)
 Opus 87: The Diary of Love, cantata after S. Vygodski for tenor, boys' chorus and chamber orchestra (1965)
 Opus 88: The Profile, song cycle after S. Vydodski for bass and piano (1965)
 Opus 89: String Quartet No. 11 (1965–1966)
 Opus 90: Words in Blood, song cycle after J. Tuwim for tenor and piano (1965)
 Opus 91: Piotr Plaksin, cantata after J. Tuwim for tenor, alto and nineteen instruments (1965)
 Opus 92: Hiroshima, cantata after Fukagawa for mixed chorus and orchestra (1966)
 Opus 93: Symphony No. 9 Everlasting Times after J. Tuwim and V. Bronievsky for narrator, chorus and orchestra (1940–1967)
 Opus 94: Concerto for trumpet and orchestra in B flat major (1966–1967)
 Opus 95: Sonata No. 2 for violin solo (1967)
 Opus 96: Requiem after D. Kedrin, M. Dudin, F. Garcia Lorca, Fukagawa and others for soprano, children's chorus, mixed chorus and orchestra (1965–1967)
 Opus 97: The Traveller, (more commonly known as The Passenger), opera in two acts (1967–1968)
 Opus 98: Symphony No. 10 in A minor (1968)
 Opus 99: Triptychon after L. Staff for bass and orchestra (1968)
 Opus 100: Twenty-four Preludes for cello solo (1968)
 Opus 101: Symphony No. 11 Festive Symphony after various revolutionary poets for chorus and orchestra (1969)
 Opus 102: Nobody did have known ......, poem after Demyan Bedny for soprano, chorus and orchestra (1970)
 Opus 103: String Quartet No. 12 (1969–1970)
 Opus 104: Concerto for clarinet and string orchestra (1970)
 [no opus number]: Zosya, opera (1970)
 Opus 105: The Madonna and the Soldier, opera in three acts after A. Medvedev (1970)
 Opus 106: Sonata No. 3 for cello solo (1971)
 Opus 107: Sonata No. 1 for viola solo (1971)
 Opus 108: Sonata No. 1 for double-bass solo (1971)
 Opus 109: The Love of d'Artagnan, opera after A. Dumas (1971)
 Opus 110: When I sing this child asleep, song-cycle after G. Mistral for soprano and piano (1973)
 Opus 111: Congratulations!, opera in one act after Sholom Aleichem's play Mazltov! (1975)
 Opus 112: Lady Magnesia, opera in one act after G.B. Shaw (1975)
 Opus 113: Six Ballet Scenes: Choreographic Symphony for orchestra (1973–1975)
 Opus 114: Symphony No. 12 In memoriam D. Shostakovich (1975–1976)
 Opus 115: Symphony No. 13 (1976)
 Opus 116: From the Lyrics of Zhukovsky, songcycle after V. Zhukovsky for bass and piano (1976)
 Opus 117: Symphony No. 14 (1977)
 Opus 118: String Quartet No. 13 (1977)
 Opus 119: Symphony No. 15 I Believe in This Earth after M. Dudin for soprano, baritone, women's chorus and orchestra (1977)
 Opus 120: Three Palmtrees after M. Lermontov for soprano and string quartet (1977)
 Opus 121: Sonata No. 2 for cello solo (second version, 1977)
 Opus 122: String Quartet No. 14 (1978)
 Opus 123: Sonata No. 2 for viola solo (1978)
 Opus 124: String Quartet No. 15 (1979)
 Opus 125: From the Lyrics of Baratinsky, songcycle after Y. Baratynsky for bass and piano (1979)
 Opus 126: Sonata No. 3 for violin solo (1979)
 Opus 127: Trio for flute, harp and viola (1979)
 Opus 128: The Portrait, opera in eight scenes after N. Gogol (1980)
 Opus 129: The Golden Dress, operetta after E. Galperina (1980)
 Opus 130: String Quartet No. 16 (1981)
 Opus 131: Symphony no. 16 (1981)
 Opus 132: The Relic, recitative for bass and piano
 Opus 133: Sonata for bassoon solo
 Opus 134: From Afanasy Fet's Poetry, songs for bass and piano
 Opus 135: Sonata No. 3 for viola solo (1982)
 Opus 136: Sonata No. 4 for viola solo (1983)
 Opus 136bis: Sonata No. 6 for violin and piano (1982)
 Opus 137: Symphony No. 17 Memory (1984)
 Opus 138: Symphony No. 18 War, there is no word more cruel (1986)
 Opus 139: Six Children's Songs for voice and piano (1986)
 Opus 140: Sonata No. 4 for solo cello (1986)
 Opus 141: String Quartet No. 1 (1986) (Recomposition of Op. 2)
 Opus 142: Symphony No. 19 The Bright May (1986)
 Opus 143: The Banners of Peace, symphonic poem (1986)
 Opus 144: The Idiot, opera after F. Dostoyevsky (1985)
 Opus 145: Chamber Symphony No. 1 (1987) (arranged from String Quartet No. 2, Op. 3)
 Opus 146: String Quartet No. 17 (1987)
 Opus 147: Chamber Symphony No. 2 (1987)
 Opus 148: Flute Concerto No. 2 (1987)
 Opus 149: Music to the Film The Tale of the Love for a Painter (1987)
 Opus 150: Symphony No. 20 (1988)
 Opus 151: Chamber Symphony No. 3 (1991)
 Opus 152: Symphony No. 21 ("Kaddish") (1991)
 Opus 153: Chamber Symphony No. 4 (1992)
 Opus 154: Symphony No. 22 (1993-94, orchestrated by Kirill Umansky in 2003)

References 
 Onno van Rijen's Moisei Vainberg/Weinberg, September 4, 2004.

Weinberg